Laszlo Kiss (born September 10, 1949) is a Hungarian former footballer and manager. He managed in the Nemzeti Bajnokság I, Nemzeti Bajnokság II, Dhivehi League, and the Canadian Soccer League.

Managerial career 
After briefly playing with Veszprém KFSE, Kiss went into managing several Hungarian clubs. Some of the prominent clubs he managed in the Nemzeti Bajnokság I were Vasas SC, Debreceni VSC, Pécsi MFC, MTK Budapest FC, Kaposvári Rákóczi FC, Videoton FC. In 1996, he went overseas to coach Club Valencia of the Dhivehi League, where he had three stints with the club. In 2008, he signed with rivals VB Sports where he won the Maldives FA Cup in 2008, and the Dhivehi League in 2009. In 2012, he went to Canada to coach Astros Vasas FC of the Canadian Soccer League. He returned to Hungary to coach Ceglédi VSE of the Nemzeti Bajnokság II.

References 

Living people
1949 births
Hungarian footballers
Hungarian football managers
Vasas SC managers
Debreceni VSC managers
MTK Budapest FC managers
Fehérvár FC managers
Pénzügyőr SE managers
Győri ETO FC managers
Diósgyőri VTK managers
North York Astros coaches
Canadian Soccer League (1998–present) managers
Association footballers not categorized by position
Footballers from Budapest